CCAR may refer to:

 Central Conference of American Rabbis
 Colorado Center for Astrodynamics Research
 CCAir, ticker symbol CCAR
 Comprehensive Capital Analysis and Review, a bank stress test conducted each year in the USA
 Continuously compounded annual return via interest payments on lent or deposited funds
 Cisco Certified Architect (CCAr) is the highest-level certification Cisco offers.

Also, CCAR1:
 'Cell division cycle and apoptosis regulator protein 1' is a protein that in humans is encoded by the CCAR1 gene.